In China, backyard furnaces were large and small blast furnaces used by the people of China during the Great Leap Forward (1958–1962). These were constructed in the fields and backyards of communes to further the Great Leap Forward's aims of making China the top steel producer in the world. However, most furnaces were only capable of producing pig iron.

Atypical fuels were often used to fire the furnaces, such as the wood of coffins. Where iron ore was unavailable, various steel and iron items were smelted for the intended result of manufacturing steel or more useful creations.

The productivity of backyard furnaces was highly variable across China. Many regions experienced a renewed interest in traditional metalworking practices, and successfully produced steel and copper. Nonetheless, backyard furnaces were largely an improvised and undisciplined pursuit in much of the countryside. In 1958, the Communist Party funded the production of dozens of documentaries on metalworking in an attempt to counteract widespread ignorance and further promote the practice.

Peasants were encouraged to prioritize iron and steel production over agricultural obligations, which may have been a contributing factor in the severity of the Great Chinese Famine. The widespread popularity of the practice led to the mass destruction of Shengbao iron cash coins from the Taiping Heavenly Kingdom.

Mao Zedong defended backyard furnaces despite the shortcomings, claiming that the practice showed mass enthusiasm, mass creativity, and mass participation in economic development.

See also
Economy of China

References

Steel industry of China
1950s in China
1960s in China
Great Leap Forward
Industrial history of China
Economic history of the People's Republic of China